Michael Patrick Corkins (born May 25, 1946) is a former Major League Baseball pitcher. The right-hander was signed by the San Francisco Giants as an amateur free agent before the 1965 season, and later drafted by the San Diego Padres from the Giants as the 31st pick in the 1968 MLB expansion draft. He played for the Padres from 1969 to 1974.

On September 22, 1969, Corkins gave up Willie Mays's 600th home run.

The majority of his 157 appearances was as a relief pitcher, but he did start 44 games. During his career, Corkins gave up 248 walks in just 459.1 innings pitched, for a BB/9IP of 4.86, much higher than the National League average at that time. However, with 335 strikeouts, his K/9IP was 6.56, which was higher than the National League average. Corkins wielded a strong bat (for a pitcher), hitting 5 home runs with a batting average of .202 in 119 lifetime at bats.

He finished his career with a total of 19 wins, 28 losses, 9 saves, 48 games finished, and an ERA of 4.39.

Corkins' major league debut with San Diego was mentioned in pitcher Jim Bouton's 1969 book, Ball Four. The book cites infielder Marty Martínez as yelling "Welcome to the National League, kid." from the Houston Astros dugout during Corkins' poor performance (a 9–2 loss).

References

External links
, or Retrosheet, or Pura Pelota

1946 births
Living people
Amarillo Giants players
Arizona Instructional League Giants players
Baseball players from Riverside, California
Elmira Pioneers players
Fresno Giants players
Hawaii Islanders players
Lexington Giants players
Major League Baseball pitchers
Salinas Packers players
Salt Lake City Bees players
San Diego Padres players
Tigres de Aragua players
American expatriate baseball players in Venezuela
Waterbury Giants players